USS Sample (FF-1048) was a frigate in the US Navy and the seventh in its class named for William Dodge Sample (9 March 1898 – 2 October 1945) who was a Rear Admiral in the United States Navy and an Escort Carrier Division commander in World War II. He was the youngest rear admiral in the Pacific Theater of World War II. It was laid down in 1963 and decommissioned in 1988, then transferred to Brazil in 1989.



History
Sample (DE-1048) was laid down on 19 July 1963 by the Puget Sound Bridge and Dry Dock Co., Lockheed Aircraft Corp., Seattle, Washington; launched on 28 April 1964; sponsored by Mrs. David M. Abshire, daughter of Rear Admiral Sample; and commissioned on 23 March 1968.

On completion of shakedown, Sample, initially assigned to Destroyer Squadron 29 (DesRon 29) at Long Beach, was ordered to Pearl Harbor and duty in DesDiv 252, DesRon 25. She arrived at her homeport for the first time on 18 October 1968, but was damaged by  the following day. Repairs to her sonar dome forced her return to the Puget Sound area; and, on 21 January 1969, she departed Bangor to return to Hawaii.

During the remainder of the winter and into the spring, Sample remained in Hawaiian waters. In mid-April, she sailed west on her first deployment to the western Pacific and duty with the 7th Fleet. Toward the end of the month, she arrived at Yokosuka, thence continued on to Okinawa and the Philippines. In early May, she arrived in Subic Bay, whence she proceeded to Tonkin Gulf for patrol and escort duty with the carriers supporting operations in South Vietnam. In June, she departed Subic for Taiwan; and, during July, she operated with the Taiwan Strait Patrol. At the end of the month, she returned to Japan; but, in early August, she was back in the South China Sea. At mid-month, she resumed Taiwan Strait patrol duties and, on the 22d, again steamed for Japan.

In mid-September, Sample departed Yokosuka and sailed south again; operated briefly on patrol off Taiwan; then continued on to the Philippines. At the end of the month, she conducted special operations in the northeastern South China Sea; and, after a call at Hong Kong, headed back to Taiwan and Japan. On 18 October, she departed the latter for Pearl Harbor and a return to duty with the 1st Fleet.

Sample remained in the eastern Pacific into the summer of 1970. On 14 July, she departed Hawaii for her second WestPac deployment. Eight days later, she joined the 7th Fleet; and, on 28 July, she arrived in Subic Bay. On 1 August, she got underway for duty as escort for the aircraft carrier  on Yankee Station. She operated with TG 77.5 in Tonkin Gulf until 25 August, then steamed for Taiwan, arriving at Kaohsiung on the 27th. By 5 September, she was back at Subic; and on 15 September, she resumed duty with TG 77.5. On 29 September, she returned to Subic; underwent boiler repairs; and sailed for Okinawa on 3 October. Arriving on 6 October, she continued on to Japan; where, from 19 to 27 October, she participated in joint United States-Japan exercises in the Sea of Japan. A call at Hong Kong followed her departure from Japan; and, on 13 November, she arrived at Keelung, Taiwan. Two days later, she continued on to Sasebo, whence she conducted exercises in the Sea of Japan, then steamed for Yokosuka. On 6 December, she departed the latter port and headed for home.

Sample returned to Pearl Harbor on 12 December. A post-deployment period of leave and liberty took her into the new year, 1971. Sample spent the entire year in Hawaii, either in port at Pearl Harbor or cruising in the local operating area. During the latter part of January, she began a period of availability, including a drydock period, which lasted until June. From June to December, she operated in Hawaiian waters; first, undergoing trials; then, refresher training; and, finally, participating in ASW exercises. The end of 1971 and the beginning of 1972 brought preparations for overseas movement. On 27 January 1972, Sample got underway for an extended deployment to the western Pacific. During the major portion of 1972, she alternated between SAR, PIRAZ, and naval gunfire support duties off the coast of Vietnam. She departed Vietnamese waters on 10 August and re-entered Pearl Harbor on the 25th.

She remained in port for the remainder of the year, engaged in post-deployment stand down and in restricted availability, the only exception being her participation in COMTUEX 4-72 between 4 and 8 December. Sample remained in Hawaii until 14 May 1973, when she redeployed to the western Pacific. After another seven months plying the waters of the Far East, she re-entered Pearl Harbor on 8 December. As of May 1974, Sample was still in port at Pearl Harbor.

[1974-1988]

Sample was decommissioned on 23 September 1988. She was stricken from the Naval Vessel Register on 24 January 2001.

Brazilian Navy service

Sample was leased to Brazil on 15 April 1989 and transferred outright to Brazil on 24 January 2001, being stricken from the U.S. Navy Naval Vessel Register the same day. She served in the Brazilian Navy as Paraná (D29).

Parana was sold for scrapping in Pakistan in December 2004.

Honors and awards
By May 1974, Sample had received five campaign stars for service off Vietnam.

References
USS Sample , Destroyers Online

External links

NavSource.org

 

Garcia-class frigates
Ships built by Lockheed Shipbuilding and Construction Company
1964 ships
Cold War frigates and destroyer escorts of the United States
Vietnam War frigates and destroyer escorts of the United States
Garcia-class frigates of the Brazilian Navy
Pará-class destroyers (1989)